Roopa Rao (born May 18) is an independent Indian film-maker from Bangalore. She is the writer and director of India's first same-sex love story web series, The Other Love Story (2016). Rao is also known for directing critically acclaimed award winning Kannada film Gantumoote (2019).

Early life

Rao completed Masters in Commerce with Personnel Management as a specialization and discontinued Masters in Finance. For a span of six Years, she worked at Infosys. Later, with a persistent desire to make movies, she quit her job to pursue film making. She completed a course in film direction and production from Asian Academy of Film and Television, Delhi. After this, she moved to London, UK to assist a documentary filmmaker.

Career

She returned to India, where she made documentaries and short films in order to improvise her craft. After co-directing Vishnuvardhana, a Kannada feature film and Kurai Ondrum Illai, an independent Tamil feature film, she began to work on her first big scale venture, The Other Love Story.

Being a writer at heart from her early teens, she had written the story of two young women falling in love during her college days but never took it further due to its unconventional story-line.

Later, in 2015, she decided to work on it herself. Since the central theme of the story is a taboo topic in India, she had difficulties finding producers for her project and turned to  Wishberry, a crowd funding platform to raise an amount of Rs 4 lakh.

The Other Love Story, a love story between two young girls, came on air on 27 August 2016. The first season consists 12 episodes. Set in the late 1990s/early 2000s of Bangalore, The Other Love Story, starring Spoorthi Gumaste and Shweta Gupta, explored the journey of two young women in love.

Rao has won "Best Director" award at NYC Web Fest 2016 and "Best Story" award at TO Web Fest 2017. The Other Love Story has a total of 3 wins and 7 nominations from various National and International Film Festivals.

After The Other Love Story, in 2017 Rao wrote and directed BFF (Breath Friend Forever), a short film where a 7-year-old, after learning about trees in class, tries to understand the importance of trees. The film was an official selection in Toronto International Film Festival (TIFF) and got screened at Ireland National Film Body in Kids Section.

In 2018, Astu Studios released a travel short film Love Leh’tter starring Roopa Rao, written and directed by Surya Vasishta. Rao co-founded an independent production house, Ameyukti Studios, with a friend in 2018.

In 2019, Rao's first feature film, Gantumoote was up for a world premiere at New York Indian Film Festival (NYIFF) where it won the "Best Screenplay" award. An intense coming of age, high school drama set in Bangalore in the 1990s, it's a relatable story of a sixteen-year-old girl and her subtle journey from the life that she thinks exists just like in the movies to the actual life that unravels before her.

Currently, she is working on producing her next venture while also writing a feature film inspired from a real life incident.

Filmography

 As Associated Director 
 Vishnuvardhana - 2011 Kannada
Kurai ondrum Illai - 2013 Tamil

Awards

 2016: New York Web Fest Award for Best Direction: The Other Love Story (2016)
 2017: TO Web Fest Award for Best LGBTQ Story: The Other Love Story (2016)
2017: Boston LGBTQ Film Festival Award for Best International Web Series: The Other Love Story(2016)
 2016: New York Web Fest Nomination for Outstanding Writing: The Other Love Story (2016)
 2016: New York Web Fest Nomination for Best Webseries: The Other Love Story (2016)
 2017: Vancouver Web Festival Award for Best Drama: The Other Love Story (2016)
 2016: Miami Short Film Festival Semi Finalist: The Other Love Story (2016)
 2019: New York Indian Film Festival Award for Best Screenplay: Gantumoote (2019)
2020: Critics Choice Film Awards Nomination for Best Director:Gantumoote (2019)
2020: Critics Choice Film Awards Nomination for Best Film:Gantumoote (2019)
2020: Critics Choice Film Awards Nomination for Best Writing:Gantumoote (2019)
2020: Critics Choice Film Awards Nomination for Best Director:Gantumoote (2019)
2020: Karnataka Film Critics Awards Nomination for Best Director:Gantumoote (2019)
2020: Karnataka Film Critics Awards Nomination for Best Writer:Gantumoote (2019)
2020: Karnataka Film Critics Awards Nomination for Best Film:Gantumoote (2019)
2020: Raghavendra Chitravani Award for Best Debudant Director:Gantumoote (2019)
2021: SIIMA Awards Nomination for Best Debudant Director:Gantumoote(2019)
2023: Indo French International Film Festival for Best Indian Short Film:Asmin(2023)
2023: Indo French International Film Festival for Best Director Critics Choice:Asmin(2023)

See also
 List of female film and television directors

References

7.https://indianexpress.com/article/entertainment/bollywood/critics-choice-film-awards-2020-complete-nominations-list-6295588/
8.https://www.cinisuddi.com/tag/raghavendra-chitravani-awards/
9. https://siima.in/2019-nominations.php
10. https://filmyfocus.com/top-10-best-kannada-movies-to-watch-on-amazon-prime

External links
 
  
 Interview on pandolin.com
 Interview on shethepeople.tv

Living people
Web series directors
Film directors from Bangalore
Indian women film directors
21st-century Indian film directors
Kannada film directors
Indian women filmmakers
21st-century Indian women artists
1981 births